Michael David Jones (born 24 April 1945) is an English former footballer who played as centre forward with Leeds United during the 1960s and 1970s. He was also capped for England.

Career

Sheffield United
Jones was spotted playing local league football for Dinnington Miners' Welfare, from where he went on to become an apprentice at Sheffield United in 1962. He graduated from the intermediate side through the Central League side before making his debut in a 1–1 draw against Manchester United at Old Trafford on 20 April 1963. He scored his first two league goals in the next fixture, a 3–1 victory against Manchester City at Maine Road four days later, on his 18th birthday. He made his England debut in 1965 against West Germany at centre forward.

Jones scored 63 goals in 149 appearances for the Blades and had earned two caps for England when he joined Leeds United in September 1967 for £100,000, prompting the Sheffield United manager, John Harris, to remark "it would be the biggest mistake the club had ever made".

Leeds United
Leeds won the League Cup in his first season although Jones did not feature in the campaign because he was cup-tied. Leeds also won the Fairs Cup, with Jones scoring twice during the competition, including what turned out to be the winner in the final against Ferencvaros. The first leg finished 1–0 thanks to Jones' goal and the second leg remained goalless to give Leeds the cup.

The following season Leeds won the League championship with Jones scoring 14 goals. Don Revie in July 1969 paid £165,000 for Leicester City striker Allan Clarke to begin a strike partnership with Jones.

Leeds pursued a possible "treble" of League title, FA Cup and European Cup. Everton beat Leeds to the League title, and Celtic F.C. beat Leeds home and away in the European Cup semi-finals. In the FA Cup final against Chelsea at Wembley, the game was 1–1 on a bumpy, sandy pitch (due to the Horse of the Year show being held there the previous week). with fewer than ten minutes to play. Jones fired a left foot shot into the net beyond Peter Bonetti. Chelsea, however, equalised quickly so the contest went to a replay at Old Trafford. Leeds took the lead in the first half, when a run by Clarke set Jones on his way towards goal, and he hit right foot shot past Bonetti. Chelsea, however, ended up winning after extra time and Leeds ended the season trophyless.

A last-day win for Arsenal cost Leeds the title again 1971, even though they won the Fairs Cup.

In 1972, Leeds beat Arsenal 1–0 in the Centenary FA Cup Final with Jones setting up Clarke for the only goal of the game. However, Jones suffered a dislocated elbow in the last minute of the game after landing awkwardly from an innocuous and accidental clash with the Arsenal goalkeeper, Geoff Barnett. The injury meant Jones missed the League title decider away to Wolves just two days later which Wolves won 2–1. The defeat cost Leeds the championship with the title going to Derby County by a single point. Perhaps his finest performance of the 1971–72 season came on 19 February 1972, when he scored a hat-trick against Manchester United in a 5–1 league win at Elland Road.

Jones played in two finals the following year, both of which Leeds again lost. Leeds were strong favourites to win the 1973 FA Cup final but lost 1–0 to Sunderland who were in the division below. Jones is best remembered for prematurely celebrating a goal by Lorimer which had not, in fact, crossed the line owing to an incredible double-save by goalkeeper Jimmy Montgomery which he had not been expected to make. Leeds subsequently lost the UEFA Cup Winners' Cup final to A.C. Milan by the same scoreline.

In a 29-match unbeaten run at the start of the next season, Jones bagged 14 goals as Leeds won the title, but he was now beginning to have problems with one of his knees and spent the summer of 1974 having intensive physiotherapy. In early 1975, he began playing reserve football again, but in constant pain. Joe Jordan took the number nine shirt. The team (despite Revie's departure in the summer to take over the England job) reached its first European Cup final, Jones was a spectator who did not figure in the team all season. He watched as Leeds lost the European Cup final to Bayern Munich and then retired at the age of 30, unable to beat his knee problem. His Leeds career ended with 111 goals from 312 appearances. Allan Clarke, Jones' strike partner, admitted that it was never the same for him after Jones retired.

Jones won three England caps.

Career statistics

Honours
Leeds United
 Football League First Division: 1968–69, 1973–74
 FA Cup: 1971–72; runner-up: 1969–70, 1972–73
 Football League Cup: 1967–68
 FA Charity Shield: 1969
 Inter-Cities Fairs Cup: 1967–68, 1970–71; runner-up: 1966–67
 European Cup Winners' Cup runner-up: 1972–73

Individual
European Cup top scorer: 1969–70
Leeds United Player of the Year: 1973–74

References

External links

MICK JONES, Post War English & Scottish Football League A–Z Player's Database

1945 births
People from Shireoaks
Footballers from Nottinghamshire
Living people
English footballers
Association football forwards
England international footballers
England under-23 international footballers
Sheffield United F.C. players
Leeds United F.C. players
English Football League players
FA Cup Final players
UEFA Champions League top scorers